The Laurel Hill Plantation, also known as Laurel Hill Farm was a historic Southern plantation located on Lady's Island, Beaufort County, South Carolina. The area is now called Coosaw Point, a upscale community with clubhouse, pool, tennis courts, and dock. The area is known for its woodlands, parks, wetlands, and the Coosaw River.

History

The history of the Laurel Hill Plantation in South Carolina goes back to the early 1800s when the island was used as farmland with enslaved African Americans living and working on the property. Fugitive slaves from the plantation were advertised in The Charleston Daily Curior with a $10 reward for their capture. In 1830 there were 23,199 people counted in the Beaufort district, 84.9% were black; while in 1850 the population had risent to 38,805, with 84.7 being black (93.2 were slaves). In terms of agriculture, in 1860, Lady's Island produced less cash value than  Saint Helena Island. The plantations on Lady's Island had insufficient capital to make planting profitable.

Dr. Berners Barnwell Sams (1787–1855) had many plantations on Ladys Island. Several miles north on the Coosaw River was Laurel Hill Plantation. When he died on March 15, 1855, he gave Laurel Hill to his son Clement Sams.

During the American Civil War, Union forces occupied the islands under the direction of General T. W. Sherman. All of the plantations gave way to military occupation. The major post on Lady's Idland was "Coosaw" or "Sams' fort on the northeaster point of the Island. At this time there were about 30 plantations on the Ladys' Island.

The Laurel Hill Plantation, also known as Laurel Hill Farm, once owned by Girard B. Henderson in the 1940-1980s, was on Sam's Point Road on Lady's Island. Truck Farming for to produce fruits, vegetables and flowers as cash crops was done on the plantation. The land has a small grass air field, once called Laurel Hill Plantation Airport, residences, and an assortment of non-historic buildings and mobile homes. Henderson died, at age 78, on November 18, 1983. Services were held at Laura Hill Chapel on Lady's Island.

In 1977, Laurel Hill Experimental Mariculture Farm on Lady's Island constructed and managed ponds for prawn culture under a cooperative research agreement with the Marine Resources Center on James Island.

The Laurel Hill Plantation was sold in 1997 to Homestake Realty Company and is now called Coosaw Point.

See also
Lady's Island (South Carolina)

References

External links
 
 Coosaw Point

Plantations in South Carolina
Towns in Beaufort County, South Carolina
Islands of Beaufort County, South Carolina
Islands of South Carolina
South Carolina Sea Islands